The Express League is a high school athletic league that is part of the CIF Southern Section. Member schools are located in Northwestern Orange County, California.

Schools
 Acaciawood College Preparatory Academy (girls' volleyball only)
 Avalon High School
 Bethel Baptist School
 Brethren Christian School
 Cornelia Connelly High School (basketball and softball only)
 Eastside Christian High School
 Fairmont Preparatory Academy (basketball only)
 Liberty Christian School (all sports)
 Lutheran High School
 Newport Christian School
 Orange County Christian
 Orangewood Academy (basketball only)
 Pioneer Baptist School
 Samueli Academy
 Southlands Christian Schools (non-basketball)
 St. Michael's Preparatory School
 Tarbut V' Torah (TVT) (baseball only)

References

CIF Southern Section leagues
Sports in Orange County, California